Vincent Sardi Sr. (December 23, 1885 – November 19, 1969) was an American restaurateur. He served as the original founder of the restaurant Sardi's for more than 50 years. Sardi was honored the Special Tony Award at the 1st Tony Awards. He died in November 1969 at the Will Rogers Memorial Hospital in Essex County, New York, at the age 83. Sardi was buried in Flushing Cemetery.

References 

1885 births
1969 deaths
Place of birth missing
American restaurateurs
Special Tony Award recipients
Burials at Flushing Cemetery